BRTC may refer to:

 Bangladesh Road Transport Corporation
 Black River Technical College
 Bahrain Radio and Television Corporation